Vermeijius is a genus of sea snails in the subfamily Fusininae  of the subfamily Fusininae of the family Fasciolariidae.

Species
Species within the genus Vermeijius include:
 Vermeijius pallidus (Kuroda & Habe, 1961)
 Vermeijius retiarius (E. von Martens, 1901)
 Vermeijius virginiae (Hadorn & Fraussen, 2002)

References

External links
 Kantor Y.I., Fedosov A.E., Snyder M.A. & Bouchet P. (2018). Pseudolatirus Bellardi, 1884 revisited, with the description of two new genera and five new species (Neogastropoda: Fasciolariidae). European Journal of Taxonomy. 433: 1-57